Rebecca Tobin (born 21 April 1988) is an American professional basketball player.

College career
Tobin played four seasons of college basketball at Arizona State University in Tempe, Arizona for the Sun Devils.

Arizona State statistics

Source

Professional career

Europe
After going undrafted Tobin travelled to Europe to begin her professional career, signing with Basket Parma in the Italian league, Serie A1. In early 2012, Tobin would then sign with CSU Alba Iulia, playing two seasons in the Liga Națională in Romania. In 2013, Tobin would remain in eastern Europe, signing with DVTK Miskolc in Hungary's Nemzeti Bajnokság I/A. In 2014, Tobin would debut in the French Ligue Féminine de Basketball with Union Angers Basket 49.
 
In 2016, Tobin returned to European basketball after signing with TSV 1880 Wasserburg in the DBBL. Tobin played here for two seasons.

WNBA
In 2015, Tobin was signed by the Phoenix Mercury to a training camp contract. However, Tobin was soon released due to health problems.

In 2016, Tobin was signed as a free-agent to the Los Angeles Sparks training camp roster. Tobin was waived before the beginning of the season.

WNBL
In May 2018, Tobin was signed by the Bendigo Spirit for the 2018–19 WNBL season. Tobin finished seventh overall in season MVP voting, and third overall in voting for the Defensive Player of the Year.

In March 2019, it was announced Tobin had re-signed with the Spirit for the 2019–20 season after a strong Australian debut the previous season.

References

1988 births
Living people
American women's basketball players
Forwards (basketball)
Centers (basketball)
Arizona State Sun Devils women's basketball players
Bendigo Spirit players
American expatriate sportspeople in Australia